Wolfgang Bauer may refer to:

Wolfgang Bauer (journalist) (born 1970), reporter for the German magazine FOCUS, who observed war crimes in Afghanistan
Wolfgang Bauer (physicist) (born 1959), German-born physicist at Michigan State University
Wolfgang Bauer (writer) (1941–2005), Austrian writer and playwright
Wolfgang Maria Bauer (born 1963), German television actor